Leandro Martín González Pírez (born 26 February 1992) is an Argentine professional footballer who plays as a centre-back for River Plate, on loan from Major League Soccer club Inter Miami.

Club career
González Pírez played his first professional game for River Plate coming on as a 90th-minute substitute in a 2–1 win over Newell's Old Boys, for the 2011 Clausura. He was loaned out twice while with River Plate to Belgian club Gent and to Argentine club Arsenal de Sarandí.

González Pírez signed with Atletico Tigre in 2015, appearing in thirty games in his sole season with the club. He then moved to Estudiantes from Atletico Tigre, earning fourteen caps with that club.

On 26 January 2017, González Pírez signed with Atlanta United FC from Estudiantes. On 10 September 2017, he scored the first goal ever at Mercedes-Benz Stadium during a 3–0 win over FC Dallas.

On 10 January 2020, González Pírez completed a transfer to Club Tijuana of Liga MX for an undisclosed fee.

González Pírez returned to the United States on 1 July 2020, joining Inter Miami.

On January 10, 2022, Inter Miami announced he would be loaned to River Plate for 2 years with an option to buy.

International career
González Pírez has featured for Argentina at the under-17 and under-20 levels. He was part of the squad for the 2009 South American Under-17 Football Championship, scoring once as Argentina lost in the final to Brazil. He was also called up for the 2009 FIFA U-17 World Cup held in Nigeria, where he made three appearances.

In 2011, he was part of the Argentina team for the 2011 South American Youth Championship and 2011 FIFA U-20 World Cup.

Career statistics

Honours
River Plate
 Primera B Nacional: 2011–12

Atlanta United
 MLS Cup: 2018
 U.S. Open Cup: 2019
 MLS Eastern Conference: 2018
 Campeones Cup: 2019

Individual
 MLS All-Star: 2019

References

External links
 
 
  
 

1992 births
Living people
Footballers from Buenos Aires
Association football central defenders
Argentine footballers
Argentina youth international footballers
Argentina under-20 international footballers
Argentine expatriate footballers
Argentine Primera División players
Belgian Pro League players
Major League Soccer players
Club Atlético River Plate footballers
K.A.A. Gent players
Arsenal de Sarandí footballers
Club Atlético Tigre footballers
Estudiantes de La Plata footballers
Atlanta United FC players
Club Tijuana footballers
Inter Miami CF players
Footballers at the 2011 Pan American Games
Expatriate footballers in Belgium
Expatriate soccer players in the United States
Pan American Games medalists in football
Pan American Games silver medalists for Argentina
Medalists at the 2011 Pan American Games